Jacques Duchaussoy is a French author of books on religion and literature.  Among his works are Bacon, Shakespeare ou Saint-Germain (1962), a non-fiction book that discussed the possibility of Francis Bacon ghost writing for Shakespeare and Miguel de Cervantes; Le Bestiaire divin ou la Symbolique des animaux (1993); and La tradition primordiale dans les religions (1990). He also wrote for the magazine "Atlantis.

Bibliography 
 Bacon, Shakespeare ou Saint-Germain (1962),
 Le Bestiaire divin ou la Symbolique des animaux (1993)
 La tradition primordiale dans les religions (1990).
 Mystère et Mission des Rose+Croix

Footnotes 

1905 births
1995 deaths 
Esotericists
French non-fiction writers
French male writers
Male non-fiction writers